Ruff's Chapel is a historic Methodist chapel at U.S. 21 and SC 34 in Ridgeway, Fairfield County, South Carolina. It was built about 1870, and is a single-story, rectangular frame building, sheathed in weatherboard, with a front gabled roof. It has a square open belfry with a metal covered bellcast hip roof and a ball finial.

It was added to the National Register of Historic Places in 1980.

References

Methodist churches in South Carolina
Properties of religious function on the National Register of Historic Places in South Carolina
Churches completed in 1870
19th-century Methodist church buildings in the United States
Churches in Fairfield County, South Carolina
National Register of Historic Places in Fairfield County, South Carolina